Mohammadabad-e Pain (also Romanized as Moḩammadābād-e Pā’īn; also known as Moḩammadābād) is a village in Mazraeh-ye Shomali Rural District, Voshmgir District, Aqqala County, Golestan Province, Iran. At the 2006 census, its population was 483, in 87 families.

References 

Populated places in Aqqala County